Macdonald River, a perennial river that is part of the Namoi catchment within the Murray–Darling basin, is located in the Northern Tablelands district of New South Wales, Australia.

Course and features

From source to mouth, the river passes through or near the villages of Woolbrook and Bendemeer.

Recreation and development

Trout fishing is possible in the waters of the Macdonald River, its creeks and tributaries upstream of the New England Highway road bridge at Bendemeer. The Namoi River snapping turtle or Bell's turtle (Elseya belli) is a species of turtle found only in the upper reaches of the Namoi River, Gwydir River and Macdonald Rivers.

The T A Perry Bridge, that carries the New England Highway and crosses the Macdonald River, was completed in 1985, enabling a bypass of the village of Bendemeer.

In November 2008, torrential rain caused severe flooding in the Macdonald River and led to the area being declared a natural disaster area.

See also

 List of rivers of Australia
 List of rivers of New South Wales (L–Z)
 Rivers of New South Wales

References

External links

 
 Trout and salmon fishing rules

Rivers of New South Wales
Murray-Darling basin